Category 3 or Category III can refer to:
 Category 3 cable, a specification for data cabling
 British firework classification
 Category 3 tropical cyclone, on any of the tropical cyclone scales
 Category 3 pandemic, on the Pandemic Severity Index, an American influenza pandemic with a case-fatality ratio between 0.5% and 1%
 Category 3 winter storm, on the Northeast Snowfall Impact Scale and the Regional Snowfall Index
 Any of several winter storms listed at list of Northeast Snowfall Impact Scale winter storms
 Category 03 non-silicate mineral - Halides
 Category III, a rating in the Hong Kong motion picture rating system
 Category III, a capability level of aircraft instrument landing systems
 Category III New Testament manuscripts - Eclectic
 Category III measurement - performed in the building installation
 Category III protected area (IUCN) - natural monument

See also 
 Class 3 (disambiguation) - class/category equivalence (for labeling)
 Type III (disambiguation) - type/category equivalence (for labeling)
 Group 3 (disambiguation) - group/category equivalence (for labeling)